Dendrocalamus sinicus, the dragon bamboo, is a gigantic clumping bamboo native to Yunnan Province of China and to Laos. Each culm can weigh up to  apiece. A plant eventually consists of about one hundred culms. This species was unknown to science prior to 1980, although of course well known to the citizens of Yunnan and Laos for centuries.

References

sinicus
Plants described in 1982